The Bohol sunbird (Aethopyga decorosa) is a species of bird in the family Nectariniidae. It is endemic to Bohol island (Philippines).

Its natural habitats are subtropical or tropical moist lowland forests and subtropical or tropical moist montane forests.

References

Bohol sunbird
Endemic birds of the Philippines
Fauna of Bohol
Bohol sunbird